In enzymology, a 4-chlorobenzoate dehalogenase is an enzyme that catalyzes the chemical reaction

4-chlorobenzoate + H2O  4-hydroxybenzoate + chloride

Thus, the two substrates of this enzyme are 4-chlorobenzoate and H2O, whereas its two products are 4-hydroxybenzoate and chloride.

This enzyme belongs to the family of hydrolases, specifically those acting on halide bonds in carbon-halide compounds.  The systematic name of this enzyme class is 4-chlorobenzoate chlorohydrolase. This enzyme is also called halobenzoate dehalogenase.

Structural studies

References 

 
 

EC 3.8.1
Enzymes of known structure